Meticrane (INN) is a diuretic.

References

Diuretics